The 2013 UCI BMX World Championships were the eighteenth edition of the UCI BMX World Championships and took place in Auckland in New Zealand and crowned world champions in the cycling discipline of BMX.

Medal summary

Medal table

External links
Official event website
Union Cycliste Internationale website

UCI BMX World Championships
UCI BMX World Championships
UCI BMX World Championships
International cycle races hosted by New Zealand
July 2013 sports events in New Zealand